The 2011 Florida Gators football team represented the University of Florida in the sport of American football during the 2011 college football season.  The Gators competed in the Football Bowl Subdivision (FBS) of the National Collegiate Athletic Association (NCAA) and the Eastern Division of the Southeastern Conference (SEC).  They played their home games at Ben Hill Griffin Stadium on the university's Gainesville, Florida campus, and were led by first-year head coach Will Muschamp.  Muschamp coached the Gators to a third-place finish in the SEC East, a 3–5 conference record, a 24–17 Gator Bowl victory over the Ohio State Buckeyes, and an overall win–loss record of 7–6 (.539).

Previous season 

The 2010 Florida Gators compiled an 8–5 overall win–loss record, and a 4–4 record in the Southeastern Conference.  They concluded the 2010 season with a 37–24 victory over the Penn State Nittany Lions in the Outback Bowl.

Schedule

Rankings

Game summaries

Florida Atlantic

Will Muschamp's debut as head coach for Florida was a success as the Gators defeated the Owls 41–3.

UAB

Tennessee

Kentucky

Alabama

LSU

Auburn

Georgia

Vanderbilt

South Carolina

Furman

Florida State

Gator Bowl

Players

Depth chart 
Projected starters and primary backups versus Florida Atlantic.

Roster

Coaching staff

Players drafted into the NFL

References

Florida
Florida Gators football seasons
Gator Bowl champion seasons
Florida Gators football